Francis Ngajokpa is an Indian  politician and member of the Naga People's Front. Ngajokpa was a member of the Manipur Legislative Assembly from the Tadubi constituency in Senapati district as a member of Indian National Congress from 2002-2007 and 2012-2017 and served as Minister for education/GAD and RD & PR minister from 2012-2016. Francis Ngajokpa left Congress in 2016 and joined BJP and in 2021 he left BJP to officially join NPF. He contested the 12th Legislative Assembly election from Tadubi Constituency in 2022 and lost.

References 

People from Senapati district
Bharatiya Janata Party politicians from Manipur
Living people
Manipur politicians
21st-century Indian politicians
Year of birth missing (living people)
Manipur MLAs 2002–2007
Manipur MLAs 2012–2017
Naga people